Lieutenant General Sir Frederick William Stopford,  (2 February 1854 – 4 May 1929) was a British Army officer, best remembered for commanding the landing at Suvla Bay in August 1915, during the Gallipoli Campaign, where he failed to order an aggressive exploitation of the initially successful landings.

Early life
Stopford was a younger son of James Stopford, 4th Earl of Courtown, and his second wife Dora Pennefather, daughter of Edward Pennefather, Lord Chief Justice of Ireland.

Military career
Stopford was commissioned into the Grenadier Guards on 28 October 1871. He was appointed aide-de-camp to Sir John Adye, chief of staff for the Egyptian Expeditionary Force, and took part in the Battle of Tel el-Kebir in 1882. He went on to be aide-de-camp to Major General Arthur Fremantle, commander of the Suakin expedition in 1885. He was then made brigade major for the Brigade of Guards, which had been posted to Egypt.

Stopford returned to England to be brigade major of the 2nd Infantry Brigade at Aldershot in 1886. He became deputy assistant adjutant general at Horseguards in 1892, and deputy assistant adjutant general at Aldershot in 1894. He took part in the Fourth Anglo-Ashanti War in 1895, and became assistant adjutant general at Horseguards in 1897.

Stopford took part in the Second Boer War as military secretary to General Sir Redvers Buller and later military secretary to the general officer commanding Natal, for which he was knighted as a Knight Commander of the Order of St Michael and St George in November 1900. After his return to Britain, he was appointed deputy adjutant general at Aldershot in 1901, and chief staff officer for I Corps with the temporary rank of brigadier general, on 1 April 1902. Two years later, he was appointed director of military training at Horseguards in 1904. He was major-general commanding the Brigade of Guards and general officer commanding of the London District from 1906. On 5 August 1914 he was appointed GOC First Army, part of Home Forces, a position he held until he took command of IX Corps.  

Stopford served in the First World War and, as general officer commanding of IX Corps, was blamed for the failure to attack following the landing at Suvla Bay in August 1915, during the Gallipoli Campaign. He was quickly replaced on 15 August by General Sir Julian Byng. He retired from the army in 1920.

References

External links
 

	
	
|-	
	
 	
	
	
|-	
 	
	
	

1854 births
1929 deaths
British Army lieutenant generals
British Army generals of World War I
British Army personnel of the Anglo-Egyptian War
British Army personnel of the Mahdist War
British Army personnel of the Second Boer War
British military personnel of the Fourth Anglo-Ashanti War
Grenadier Guards officers
Knights Commander of the Order of St Michael and St George
Knights Commander of the Order of the Bath
Knights Commander of the Royal Victorian Order
Lieutenants of the Tower of London
Military personnel from Dublin (city)
Frederick
Younger sons of earls